The leaden-bellied fine-lined slider (Lerista vanderduysi)  is a species of skink found in Queensland in Australia.

References

Lerista
Reptiles described in 2016
Taxa named by Andrew P. Amey
Taxa named by Patrick J. Couper
Taxa named by Jessica Worthington Wilmer